The Lodh Falls (also known as Budha Ghagh) is a waterfall in a mid forest of Palamau Tiger Reserve, South division of Latehar district in Jharkhand state in India. It is the highest waterfall in Jharkhand and the 21st highest waterfall in India.

Waterfall
It is located on the Burha River, deep in the forest of the Latehar district the Chota Nagpur Plateau. The Lodh Falls is a tiered waterfall with multiple distinct drops in a relatively close succession. The thundering sound of the fall is audible even 10 km away.

The Lodh Falls is an example of a nick point caused by rejuvenation. Knick point, also called a nick point or simply nick, represents breaks in slopes in the longitudinal profile of a river caused by rejuvenation. The break in channel gradient allows water to fall vertically giving rise to a waterfall.

See also
List of waterfalls in India
List of waterfalls in India by height

References

External links
Government of Jharkhand - Waterfalls

Ranchi
Waterfalls of Jharkhand
Waterfalls of India